Lanmaoa pseudosensibilis is a fungus of the family Boletaceae native to the United States. First described officially in 1971 by mycologists Alexander H. Smith and Harry Delbert Thiers, it was transferred to the newly circumscribed genus Lanmaoa in 2015.

While edible, it is not recommended as it could be confused with toxic species.

See also
 List of North American boletes

References

External links
 

Boletaceae
Edible fungi
Fungi described in 1971
Fungi of the United States
Taxa named by Alexander H. Smith
Fungi without expected TNC conservation status